Urban Development Directorate is a Bangladesh government regulatory agency under the Ministry of Housing and Public Works responsible for urban planning. Dr Khurshid Zabin Hossain Taufiq is the Director of Urban Development Directorate.

History
Urban Development Directorate was 17 July 1965 to develop urban areas. In 1983, Brigadier General Enamul Haque Khan led Martial Law Committee on Organizational set up recommended upgrading the department and increasing its responsibilities. It was approved by a review committee led by Major General Atiqur Rahman.

References

1965 establishments in East Pakistan
Organisations based in Dhaka
Government departments of Bangladesh
Government agencies of Bangladesh